Temple University station is an above-ground SEPTA Regional Rail station located at the eastern edge of the Temple University campus at 915 West Berks Street between 9th and 10th Streets, in the Cecil B. Moore section of Lower North Philadelphia, Pennsylvania. The station is in the Center City fare zone, although the station itself is located in North Philadelphia.

There is a small ticket kiosk located at the base of the stairs on the street level. Temple University maintains a security kiosk at street level. Stairways and two elevators lead up to the high-level platforms at track level. There are two island platforms serving four tracks. The platforms have a canopy overhead and some wind-breaking walls, but are otherwise exposed to the weather.

This station is located approximately 2.6 track miles from Suburban Station. In FY 2005, Temple University station was the fourth busiest station in SEPTA's Regional Rail system, with 2,448 average total weekday boardings and 2,593 average weekday alightings. The station also has two large bicycle racks that both have roofs above them to protect bikes against the weather. The station can easily accommodate 30+ bicycles. The racks are also in full view of the 24-hour security guard.

Station history
Built in 1911, the old Temple U station achieved infamy in November 1984 when SEPTA was forced to shut down the Reading side of the railroad above North Broad Street Station. A few days after the Center City Commuter Connection and Market East Station (now Jefferson Station) fully opened, some of the girders supporting the tracks in the platform area on the bridge over the avenue were discovered to be in imminent danger of collapse. The emergency repairs, completed early in 1985, included demolishing the station and replacing it with temporary wooden low-level platforms and steel stairs which served until the new station opened. This event helped draw attention to the deterioration of North American railroad and transit infrastructure; the two-year-long RailWorks project which resulted would provide a permanent, modern station at a location more convenient to Temple's campus.

The station was opened in 1992 and was built for $37 million as part of SEPTA's RailWorks project to rebuild the Reading Railroad viaduct in North Philadelphia. The station sits on the Reading side of the system and almost all trains stop here. The new station replaced the older Temple U station, which was originally named Columbia Avenue (a street since renamed Cecil B. Moore Avenue).

Station layout
The station has two island platforms serving four tracks.

Gallery

References

External links

SEPTA - Temple University Station
 Berks Street entrance from Google Maps Street View
 Norris Street entrance from Google Maps Street View

SEPTA Regional Rail stations
Railway stations in the United States opened in 1993
Railway stations in Philadelphia
Temple University
Railway stations in Pennsylvania at university and college campuses
Stations on the SEPTA Main Line
Railway stations in the United States opened in 1911
Wilmington/Newark Line